Cyclogomphus heterostylus is a species of dragonfly in the family Gomphidae. It is known only parts of south and central India. It is found in marshlands along the rivers and lakes where it breeds. There is no other information regarding its habitat or ecology of this species available.

See also
 List of odonates of India
 List of odonata of Kerala

References

Gomphidae
Insects described in 1854